Vivid LIVE is an annual contemporary music festival held by Sydney Opera House as part of Vivid Sydney. Taking place across all six venues at the Opera House, it features a bill of local and international artists, specially commissioned works and the hallmark Lighting of the Sails. It stands as the centrepiece of the Sydney Opera House's contemporary music program.

At the forefront of each lineup are influential artists performing their most impactful works. Over the years this has included The Cure’s Reflections (2011); Kraftwerk’s retrospective, The Catalogue 1 2 3 4 5 6 7 8 in 3D (2013); Brian Eno’s Pure Scenius (2009); Lou Reed & Laurie Anderson (2010) and the Pixies (2014).

Unique projects have ranged from the Yeah Yeah Yeahs' Karen O in Stop The Virgens (2012); Sufjan Stevens, Bryce Dessner & Nico Muhly in Planetarium (2012) to Bon Iver’s Justin Vernon, Megafaun and Fight the Big Bull in Sounds of the South (2013).

Vivid LIVE has also seen Australian premieres and exclusive performances from the likes of Ms. Lauryn Hill (2014); Amon Tobin’s ISAM (2012); Chris Cunningham (2011); Bat For Lashes (2011); The Gurrumul Project (2013) and the late Bobby Womack (2013). Most notably, it has showcased a series of emerging artists who have since established themselves at the forefront of contemporary music—including Nils Frahm (2014), St Vincent (2014), Danny Brown (2013), Flume (2009) and Jon Hopkins (2009).

Vivid LIVE was the winner of the Helpmann Award for Best Contemporary Music Festival in 2015.

In 2018 Vivid LIVE celebrated it’s 10th anniversary.

History 
In its inaugural incarnation, Luminous, the festival was curated by Brian Eno whose aim was to produce a truly eclectic lineup: "people who work in the new territories, the places in between, the places out at the edges." Acts included New York city's experimental rock group Battles, trumpet player and composer Jon Hassell, and comedian/musician Reggie Watts.

In 2010, the late Lou Reed and his wife Laurie Anderson realised their artistic vision by performing works of their own, with Reed's Metal Machine Trio and Anderson's Transitory Life.

2011 saw the Sydney-based music promoter and founder of Modular Recordings Steve Pavlovic program the likes of The Cure, video artist Chris Cunningham and psychedelic rock project Tame Impala. The Studio venue was also transformed into a club space for the first time with parties curated by The Avalanches, Mad Racket featuring Gavin Russom’s The Crystal Ark and 2manydjs.

In 2012, Sydney Opera House took the programming of the festival into its own hands, reflecting the rising status of contemporary music at the performing arts centre. Fergus Lineham, the Head of Contemporary Music at the time, said the change was necessary to facilitate the ambitious nature of the festival: "there was such a time commitment and a geographical challenge that it meant we ended up with a lot of people who would have loved to do something but wouldn't do the whole thing." The lineup included Sufjan Stevens, Florence + the Machine and the Ceremonial Orchestra, and the Australian premiere of Shut Up and Play the Hits—a documentary recounting the lead up to LCD Soundsystem's final performance. Karen O also appeared in the Australian debut of her "psycho-opera" Stop the Virgens.

In 2015, Ben Marshall, Head of Contemporary Music at Sydney Opera House, presented his first Vivid LIVE line up — one that he described as "a celebration of unique individuals' voices". In a first for contemporary music at the Opera House, Sydney label Future Classic presented concerts on the Northern Broadwalk.

2020 saw no festival due to the COVID-19 pandemic.

Artist lineups by year

2009 
Curated by Brian Eno

 Battles
 Ladytron
 Jon Hopkins
 Reggie Watts
 Jon Hassell
 Lee "Scratch" Perry
 Rachid Taha
 Damien Dempsey & the cosmic Laraaji
 The Necks & Back to Back Theatre

2010 
Curated by Laurie Anderson and Lou Reed

 Lou Reed's Metal Machine Trio
 Laurie Anderson's Transitory Life
 Rickie Lee Jones
 Young Jean Lee
 Bardo Pond
 Boris
 King Khan & BBQ Show
 My Brightest Diamond
 Chirgilchin

2011 
Curated by Steve Pavlovic

 The Cure
 Spiritualized
 Chris Cunningham
 Yo Gabba Gabba!
 Sonny Rollins
 Bat For Lashes
 Hypnotic Brass Ensemble
 Tame Impala
 Cut Copy
 The Avalanches (DJ Set)
 2manydjs
 Tom Kuntz
 Architecture in Helsinki
 OFWGKTA
 Wu Lyf
 Azari & III
 The Crystal Ark
 Dom
 Sneaky Sundays
 Superbein
 Mad Racket
 Van She
 Flight Facilities
 Bag Raiders
 Canyons
 Andee Frost
 Horse Meat Disco
 Daniele Baldelli
 Club Kooky
 The Swiss
 Beni
 Softwar
 Bamboo Musik
 Changes

2012 

 Sufjan Stevens
 Nico Muhly
 Bryce Dessner
 Karen O and KK Barrett’s Stop the Virgens
 Florence + the Machine
 Janelle Monáe
 The Temper Trap
 Amon Tobin’s ISAM
 Seekae
 My Brightest Diamond
 Danny Brown
 MED
 Tom Vek
 Kindness
 Zola Jesus
 Efterklang with the Sydney Symphony
 Imogen Heap
 Asylum
 Jonathan Boulet
 PVT
 Australian premiere of LCD Soundsystem’s documentary Shut Up and Play the Hits

2013 

 Empire of the Sun
 Kraftwerk
 Sounds Of The South (featuring Bon Iver’s Justin Vernon)
 Bobby Womack
 Vangelis - music from Blade Runner
 Bish Bosch Ambisymphonic
 The Gurrumul Project
 Karl Hyde (Underworld)
 Sunnyboys
 Cloud Control
 Live Transmission – Joy Division Reworked
 C.W. Stoneking
 The Sunnyboy (Sunnyboys documentary)
 Matthew E. White

2014 

 Pixies
 The Music of Moroder - Heritage Orchestra
 Timeline – Australian Chamber Orchestra featuring The Presets
 Lauryn Hill
 St. Vincent
 James Vincent McMorrow
 Anna Calvi
 Midlake
 Nils Frahm
 Kate Miller-Heidke
 Since I Left You – A Celebration of The Avalanches with Jonti and The Astral Kids
 Penny Penny

2015 

 Morrissey
 Sufjan Stevens
 Daniel Johns
 TV On The Radio
 Bill Callahan
 Squarepusher
 The Drones
 The Preatures
 Repressed Records night featuring Royal Headache
 Melbourne Ska Orchestra
 Future Classic 10th anniversary party featuring Flume, Flight Facilities, Seekae, Hayden James, Wave Racer, Touch Sensitive, George Maple & Charles Murdoch
 Red Bull Studio Parties

2016 

 Anohni
 Bon Iver
 Deafheaven
 Dress Up Attack
 Esperanza Spalding
 Hiatus Kaiyote
 Max Richter's Sleep
 New Order + ACO
 Oneohtrix Point Never
 Polica
 Ta-ku
 Tiny Ruins
 Wayne Shorter Quartet
 Goodgod Super Club – Ben Fester, Kyle Hall, Magda
 Goodgod Super Club feat. Bradley Zero
 Goodgod Super Club feat. Oneman, Mike Who
 Goodgod Super Club – Asmara, Chanel

2017 

 Lighting the Sails: "Audio Creatures" by Ash Bolland, music by Amon Tobin
 Fleet Foxes
 Nick Murphy fka Chet Faker presents Missing Link
 Laura Marling
 AIR
 The Avalanches - Since I Left You Block Party with special guests DJ Shadow, Briggs, Sampa the Great, Jonti + DJ JNETT
 Richie Hawtin CLOSE
 Beth Orton
 Repressed Records 15th Anniversary Feat. Total Control, Severed Heads & More
 Lisa Hannigan
 Bill Callahan
 Sampha
 Nai Palm (Hiatus Kaiyote)
 The Necks
 Camp Cope
 The Preatures (Album Preview)
 The Nixon Tapes, scenes from Nixon in China by John Adams
 Mountain, an ACO collaboration
 Goodgod Super Club presents: DJ Harvey
 Goodgod Super Club presents: Karizma & Ben Fester
 Goodgod Super Club presents: Steffi & Magda Bytnerowicz
 Goodgod Super Club presents: Kenji Takimi with Noise in my Head & Nite Fleit
 Soft Future Piano Bar, presented by Goodgod
 Talk: Nick Murphy in conversation with Lauren Taylor
 Talk: Richie Hawtin in conversation with Ben Marshall, Vivid LIVE Festival Curator

2018

 Solange
 Mazzy Star
 Ice Cube
 Cat Power 
 Dreams 
 H.E.R.
 Iron & Wine
 Neil Finn 
 Total Control & Friends 
 Middle Kids
 No Mono
 Joep Beving
 Fugazi's Instrument 
 Xylouris White
 HTRK
 An Evening with Repressed Records 
 Ambient 1: Music for Airports performed by Alaska Orchestra 
 Club Kooky
 Kuren + Electric Fields
 Burial 12"s all night long 
 Astral People 
 Mad Racket 
 Lighting of the Sails

2019

The Cure 
Maggie Rogers
Underworld
Briggs' Bad Apples House Party
Herbie Hancock
Sharon Van Etten
Dirty Three {{small|(25th Anniversary of Dirty Three)}}
Kelsey Lu
Jónsi & Alex 
Club Kooky by the Harbour
Mad Racket by the Harbour 
Johan Johansson 
Grouper
Spunk Records 20th Anniversary featuring The Middle East and special guests
Stella Donnelly
Keaton Henson: Six Lethargies with the Opera Australia Orchestra
Lonnie Holley
The Spirit of ChurakiThe Dirty Three'' Documentary Screening
Studio Parties: Park Hye Jin, A Guy Called Gerald, and more
The Hidden Pulse, with M+
Lighting of the Sails: Andrew Thomas Huang

References

External links 
Vivid LIVE Festival Site
Vivid Sydney
Contemporary Music - Sydney Opera House
Sydney Opera House

Sydney Opera House
Music festivals in Australia
Arts in Australia
Festivals in Sydney
Cultural festivals in Australia
Music festivals established in 2009